Rubén Arellano Rodríguez (born 25 March 1947) is a Mexican politician from the National Action Party. From 2009 to 2012, he was a deputy of the LXI Legislature of the Mexican Congress representing Guanajuato.

References

1947 births
Living people
Politicians from Guanajuato
National Action Party (Mexico) politicians
21st-century Mexican politicians
Members of the Congress of Guanajuato
Deputies of the LXI Legislature of Mexico
Members of the Chamber of Deputies (Mexico) for Guanajuato